Karina Pacheco (born ) is an Argentine female volleyball player.

She was part of the Argentina women's national volleyball team at the 2003 FIVB Volleyball World Grand Prix, and the 2007 Women's Pan-American Volleyball Cup.

At club level she played for Boca Juniors.

References

1977 births
Living people
Argentine women's volleyball players